The 2002 Atlantic hurricane season was a near-average Atlantic hurricane season. It officially started on June 1, 2002, and ended on November 30, dates which conventionally limit the period of each year when most tropical cyclones develop in the Atlantic Ocean. The season produced fourteen tropical cyclones, of which twelve developed into named storms; four became hurricanes, and two attained major hurricane status. While the season's first cyclone did not develop until July 14, activity quickly picked up: eight storms developed in the month of September. It ended early however, with no tropical storms forming after October 6—a rare occurrence caused partly by El Niño conditions. The most intense hurricane of the season was Hurricane Isidore with a minimum central pressure of 934 mbar, although Hurricane Lili attained higher winds and peaked at Category 4 whereas Isidore only reached Category 3. However, Lili had a minimum central pressure of 938 mbar.

The season was less destructive than normal, causing an estimated $2.47 billion (2002 USD) in property damage and 50 fatalities.
Most destruction was due to Isidore, which caused about $1.28 billion (2002 USD) in damage and killed seven people in the Yucatán Peninsula and later the United States, and Hurricane Lili, which caused $1.16 billion (2002 USD) in damage and 15 deaths as it crossed the Caribbean Sea and eventually made landfall in Louisiana.

Seasonal forecasts 

Noted hurricane expert William M. Gray and his associates at Colorado State University issue forecasts of hurricane activity each year, separately from the National Oceanic and Atmospheric Administration (NOAA). Gray's team determined the average number of storms per season between 1950 and 2000 to be 9.6 tropical storms, 5.9 hurricanes, and 2.3 major hurricanes (storms exceeding Category 3). A normal season, as defined by NOAA, has 9 to 12 named storms, of which 5 to 7 reach hurricane strength and 1 to 3 become major hurricanes.

Pre-season forecasts
On December 7, 2001, Gray's team issued its first extended-range forecast for the 2002 season, predicting above-average activity (13 named storms, 8 hurricanes, and about 2 of Category 3 or higher). It listed an 86 percent chance of at least one major hurricane striking the U.S. mainland. This included a 58 percent chance of at least one major hurricane strike on the East Coast, including the Florida peninsula, and a 43 percent chance of at least one such strike on the Gulf Coast from the Florida Panhandle westward. The potential for major hurricane activity in the Caribbean was forecast to be above average.

On April 5 a new forecast was issued, calling for 12 named storms, 7 hurricanes and 3 intense hurricanes. The decrease in the forecast was attributed to the further intensification of El Niño conditions. The estimated potential for at least one major hurricane to affect the U.S. was decreased to 75 percent; the East Coast potential decreased slightly to 57 percent, and from the Florida Panhandle westward to Brownsville, Texas, the probability remained the same.

Mid-season forecasts
On August 7, 2002, Gray's team lowered its season estimate to 9 named storms, with 4 becoming hurricanes and 1 becoming a major hurricane, noting that conditions had become less favorable for storms than they had been earlier in the year. The sea-level pressure and trade wind strength in the tropical Atlantic were reported to be above normal, while sea surface temperature anomalies were on a decreasing trend.

On August 8, 2002, NOAA revised its season estimate to 7–10 named storms, with 4–6 becoming hurricanes and 1–3 becoming major hurricanes. The reduction was attributed to less favorable environmental conditions and building El Niño conditions.

Seasonal summary

The Atlantic hurricane season officially began on June 1, 2002. It was a near-average season in which 14 tropical cyclones formed. Twelve depressions attained tropical storm status, and four of these reached hurricane status. Two hurricanes further intensified into major hurricanes. Activity was suppressed somewhat by an El Niño, which was of near-moderate intensity by August. Four named storms made landfall in Louisiana, a record which was later tied in 2020. Overall, the Atlantic tropical cyclones of 2002 collectively resulted in 50 deaths and around $2.47 billion in damage. The season ended on November 30, 2002.

Tropical cyclogenesis began with Tropical Storm Arthur, which formed just offshore North Carolina on July 14. Following the storm's extratropical transition on July 16, no further activity occurred until Tropical Storm Bertha developed near Louisiana on August 4. Cristobal formed on the next day, while Dolly developed on August 29. September featured eight named storms, a record which was later tied in 2007 and 2010 and surpassed in 2020. During that month, Gustav reached hurricane intensity on September 11, the latest date of the first hurricane in a season since 1941. While the long-lasting Kyle and Lili persisted into October, only one tropical cyclone developed that month, Tropical Depression Fourteen on October 14. The depression was absorbed by a cold front while crossing Cuba two days later, ending seasonal activity.

The season's activity was reflected with a low accumulated cyclone energy (ACE) rating of 67, the lowest total since 1997. ACE is, broadly speaking, a measure of the power of the hurricane multiplied by the length of time it existed, so storms that last a long time, as well as particularly strong hurricanes, have high ACEs. It is only calculated for full advisories on tropical systems at or exceeding , which is the threshold for tropical storm status.

Systems

Tropical Storm Arthur

Arthur formed out of a tropical depression off the coast of North Carolina on July 14 from a decaying frontal zone. It then moved out to sea, strengthening slightly into a tropical storm on July 15. Arthur gradually strengthened and peaked as a  tropical storm on the following day. However, cooler waters and upper-level shear caused it to weaken. By July 17, Arthur had become extratropical, and moved north over Newfoundland. It proceeded to weaken below gale strength. Later, one person drowned in the Conne River in Newfoundland due to Arthur.

Tropical Storm Bertha

A surface trough of low pressure that would later spawn Tropical Storm Cristobal developed a tropical depression in the northern Gulf of Mexico on August 4. It quickly strengthened into a minimal tropical storm early on August 5, and made landfall near Boothville, Louisiana, just two hours later. Bertha weakened to a tropical depression, but retained its circulation over Louisiana. A high-pressure system built southward, unexpectedly forcing the depression to the southwest. It emerged back over the Gulf of Mexico on August 7, where proximity to land and dry air prevented further strengthening. Bertha moved westward and made a second landfall near Kingsville, Texas, on August 9 with winds of only . The storm dissipated about 10 hours later.

Minor flooding was reported, which caused light damage to a few businesses, 15 to 25 houses, and some roadways. Overall, damage was very minor, totaling to $200,000 (2002 USD) in damage. In addition, one death was reported due to Bertha, a drowning due to heavy surf in Florida.

Tropical Storm Cristobal

On August 5, Tropical Depression Three formed off the coast of South Carolina from a surface trough of low pressure – the same trough that spawned Tropical Storm Bertha in the Gulf of Mexico. Under a southerly flow, the depression drifted southward, where dry air and wind shear inhibited significant development. The storm meandered eastward and was absorbed by a front on August 9.

The interaction between the extratropical remnant and a high-pressure system produced strong rip currents along the coastline of Long Island. The storm also caused waves of three to four ft (1.2 m) in height. Three people drowned from the rip currents and waves in New York.

Tropical Storm Dolly

Six hours later, the depression was upgraded to Tropical Storm Dolly after developing sufficient outflow and curved banding features. After peaking in intensity, the storm suddenly lost organization, and the winds decreased to minimal tropical storm force. After a brief re-intensification trend, Dolly again weakened due to wind shear. On September 4, Dolly weakened to a tropical depression, and later that day was absorbed by the trough; it never affected land.

Tropical Storm Edouard

Edouard formed out of an area of disturbed weather north of the Bahamas on September 2. It drifted northward, then executed a clockwise loop off the coast of Florida. Despite dry air and moderate upper-level shear, Edouard strengthened to a peak of  winds, but the unfavorable conditions caught up with it. The storm weakened as it turned west-southwestward, and made landfall near Ormond Beach, Florida on September 5 as a minimal tropical storm. Edouard crossed Florida, and emerged over the Gulf of Mexico as a minimal depression. Outflow from the stronger Tropical Storm Fay caused Tropical Depression Edouard to weaken further, and Edouard was eventually absorbed by Fay.

Though it was a tropical storm at landfall, winds were light across the path of the storm over land. Several roads were flooded from moderate precipitation. No casualties were reported, and damage was minimal.

Tropical Storm Fay

In early September, a low pressure center developed along a trough of low pressure, and on September 5, the system had gained sufficient organization to be a tropical depression, to the southeast of Galveston. The system then abruptly turned to the west-northwest, and remained steady in strength and course until landfall the next day, near Matagorda. It quickly degenerated into a remnant low, which itself moved slowly southwestward over Texas. The low eventually dissipated on September 11 over northeastern Mexico.

The storm brought heavy rainfall in Mexico and Texas. The storm caused moderate flooding in some areas due to high rainfall amounts, which left about 400 homes with some form of damage. In total, 400 houses sustained damage from flooding. 1,575 houses were damaged from the flooding or tornadic damage, 23 severely, amounting to $4.5 million (2002 USD) in damage. No deaths are attributed to Fay.

Tropical Depression Seven

A tropical wave exited Africa on September 1, and after initial development became disorganized. At the time, the depression had persistent convection around a small circulation, and it moved steadily westward due to a ridge to its north. Shortly after forming, strong wind shear diminished the convection and left the center partially exposed. By September 8, there was no remaining thunderstorm activity, and the depression degenerated into a remnant low-pressure area. The storm dissipated shortly after as strong wind shear continued to cause the storm to deteriorate while located 980 mi (1580 mi) southeast of Bermuda. The depression never affected land.

Hurricane Gustav

An area of unsettled weather developed between the Bahamas and Bermuda on September 6, and over the next few days convection increased in intensity and coverage. On September 8, the system gained sufficient organization to be declared a subtropical depression off the Southeast United States coast; later that day, the system was named Subtropical Storm Gustav. After attaining tropical characteristics on September 10, Gustav passed slightly to the east of the Outer Banks of North Carolina as a tropical storm before. While moving northeastward, Gustav intensified into a hurricane on September 11 and briefly became a Category 2 hurricane, prior to making two landfalls in Atlantic Canada as a Category 1 hurricane on September 12. Gustav became extratropical over Newfoundland around 1200 UTC that day, though the remnants meandered over the Labrador Sea before dissipating on September 15.

The storm was responsible for one death and $100,000 (2002 USD) in damage, mostly in North Carolina. The interaction between Gustav and a non-tropical system produced strong winds that caused an additional $240,000 (2002 USD) in damage in New England, but this damage was not directly attributed to the hurricane. In Atlantic Canada, the hurricane and its remnants brought heavy rain, tropical storm and hurricane-force winds, as well as storm surges for several days. Localized flooding was reported in areas of Prince Edward Island, and 4,000 people in Halifax, Nova Scotia and Charlottetown, Prince Edward Island were left without power.

Tropical Storm Hanna

In early September, a tropical wave merged with a trough of low pressure in the Gulf of Mexico and spawned a low-pressure system. Convection steadily deepened on September 11 east of the upper-level low and the surface low; it was classified as Tropical Depression Nine the next day. The disorganized storm moved westward, then northward, where it strengthened into Tropical Storm Hanna later that day.

Because most of the associated convective activity was east of the center of circulation, minimal damage was reported in Louisiana and Mississippi. To the east on Dauphin Island, Alabama, the storm caused coastal flooding which closed roads and forced the evacuation of residents. Portions of Florida received high wind gusts, heavy rainfall, and strong surf that resulted in the deaths of three swimmers. Throughout the state, 20,000 homes lost electricity. The heavy rainfall progressed into Georgia, where significant flooding occurred. Crop damage was extensive, and over 300 structures were damaged by the flooding. Overall, Hanna caused a total of about $20 million (2002 USD) in damage and three fatalities.

Hurricane Isidore

On September 9, a tropical wave moved off the coast of Africa, and by September 14 it was classified as a tropical depression. The next day the storm was located just south of Jamaica, and it developed into Tropical Storm Isidore. On September 19, it intensified into a hurricane, and Isidore made landfall in western Cuba as a Category 1 storm. After returning to the Gulf of Mexico as a tropical storm, Isidore's final landfall was near Grand Isle, Louisiana, on September 26. The storm weakened to a tropical depression over Mississippi early the following day, before becoming extratropical over Pennsylvania later on September 27 and then being absorbed by a frontal system.

Isidore made landfall on the Yucatán Peninsula of southern Mexico as a Category 3 hurricane, leaving $950 million (2002 USD) in damage in the country. The rainfall was responsible for flooding that caused moderate crop damage, with a total of $330 million in damage (2002 USD).

Tropical Storm Josephine

A non-tropical low developed along a dissipating stationary front on September 16 in the central Atlantic and drifted north-northeastward. A wind report early on September 18 indicated the depression intensified into Tropical Storm Josephine. The storm continued generally northeastward, steered between a subtropical high to the northeast and a frontal system approaching from the west. Josephine maintained a well-defined circulation, but its deep convection remained intermittent. Early on September 19 the storm began being absorbed by the cold front, and as a tropical cyclone its winds never surpassed . The extratropical low was quickly absorbed by another larger extratropical system on the afternoon of September 19.

Hurricane Kyle

A non-tropical low formed into Subtropical Depression Twelve, well east-southeast of Bermuda on September 20. It became Subtropical Storm Kyle the next day, and Tropical Storm Kyle on September 22. Kyle drifted slowly westward, slowly strengthening, and reached hurricane strength on September 25; it weakened back into a tropical storm on September 28. The cyclone's strength continued to fluctuate between tropical depression and tropical storm several times. Its movement was also extremely irregular, as it shifted sharply north and south along its generally westward path. On October 11, Kyle reached land and made its first landfall near McClellanville, South Carolina. While skirting the coastline of the Carolinas, it moved back over water, and made a second landfall near Long Beach, North Carolina later the same day. Kyle continued out to sea where it merged with a cold front on October 12, becoming the fourth longest-lived Atlantic hurricane.

Kyle brought light precipitation to Bermuda, but no significant damage was reported there. Moderate rainfall accompanied its two landfalls in the United States, causing localized flash flooding and road closures. Floodwaters forced the evacuation of a nursing home and several mobile homes in South Carolina. Kyle spawned at least four tornadoes, the costliest of which struck Georgetown, South Carolina; it damaged 106 buildings and destroyed seven others, causing eight injuries. Overall damage totaled about $5 million (2002 USD), and no direct deaths were reported. However, the remnants of Kyle contributed to one indirect death in the British Isles.

Hurricane Lili

On September 16, a tropical wave moved off the coast of Africa and across the Atlantic. It developed a low level cloud circulation midway between Africa and the Lesser Antilles on September 20. After nearly reaching hurricane status over the eastern Caribbean, the storm degenerated into a tropical wave on September 25, before becoming a tropical depression again early on September 27. The cyclone re-intensified into a tropical storm several hours later. On September 30, Lili became a hurricane while passing over the Cayman Islands. After striking Cuba's Isla de la Juventud and Pinar del Río Province as a Category 2, the storm attained Category 4 status in the Gulf of Mexico, However, Lili rapidly weakened to a Category 1 hurricane before making landfall near Intracoastal City, Louisiana, on October 3. The next day, it was absorbed by an extratropical low near the Tennessee – Arkansas border.

A total of 237,000 people lost power, and oil rigs offshore were shut down for up to a week.

Tropical Depression Fourteen

A weak tropical wave moved through the Lesser Antilles on October 9. As the system reached the southwestern Caribbean Sea on October 12, convection increased, and a broad low-pressure area formed later that day. Over the next two days, the low significantly organized, and became Tropical Depression Fourteen at 1200 UTC on October 14. The depression initially tracked west-northwestward, but then curved to the north-northeast. Due to vertical wind shear, the depression was unable to intensify, and remained below tropical storm status during its duration. While crossing the island, the depression was absorbed by a cold front early on October 17. Minimal impact was reported, which was limited to locally heavy rains over portions of Jamaica, Cuba, and the Cayman Islands.

Storm names

The following list of names was used for named storms that formed in the North Atlantic in 2002. The names not retired from this list were used again in the 2008 season. This was the same list used in the 1996 season, with the exception of the names Cristobal, Fay and Hanna, which replaced Cesar, Fran and Hortense respectively. The three new names were used for Atlantic storms for the first time.

Beginning in 2002, subtropical cyclones were named from the standard predetermined naming list upon gaining gale-force winds. This was first demonstrated with Gustav, which originated as a subtropical cyclone and was named from the predetermined list before becoming tropical and intensifying into a hurricane.

Retirement

On March 30, 2003, the World Meteorological Organization retired the names Isidore and Lili from its rotating Atlantic hurricane name lists due to the damage each caused. Those names were replaced with Ike and Laura for the 2008 season.

Season effects
The following table lists all of the storms that formed in the 2002 Atlantic hurricane season. It includes their duration, names, intensities, areas affected, damages, and death totals. Deaths in parentheses are additional and indirect (an example of an indirect death would be a traffic accident), but were still related to that storm. Damage and deaths include totals while the storm was extratropical, a wave, or a low, and all of the damage figures are in 2002 USD.

See also

 Tropical cyclones in 2002
 List of Atlantic hurricanes
 2002 Pacific hurricane season
 2002 Pacific typhoon season
 2002 North Indian Ocean cyclone season
 South-West Indian Ocean cyclone seasons: 2001–02, 2002–03
 Australian region cyclone seasons: 2001–02, 2002–03
 South Pacific cyclone seasons: 2001–02, 2002–03

Notes

References

External links

 Monthly Weather Review
 National Hurricane Center 2002 Atlantic hurricane season summary
 U.S. Rainfall from Tropical Cyclones in 2002

 
Atlantic hurricane seasons
Tropical cyclones in 2002